Pyrausta stigmatalis is a moth in the family Crambidae. It is found in Suriname.

References

Moths described in 1855
stigmatalis
Moths of South America